Unión de Pequeños Agricultores v Council of the European Union (2002) C-50/00 P is an EU law case, concerning a judicial review of a regulation adopted by the European Union. In this case, the European Court of Justice declined to accept the preliminary opinion of the Advocate General, Francis Jacobs.

Facts
The Unión de Pequeños Agricultores (UPA), representing small Spanish agricultural businesses, challenged Council Regulation 1638/98, which withdrew subsidies from olive oil producers. UPA admitted the measure was a true regulation, and the applicants lacked individual concern, but argued that because it did not require implementation at national level, there was no way to challenge the action before national courts, and it would be denied effective judicial protection unless it could bring a direct action. The Court of First Instance had held that UPA had no locus standi under TEC art 230(4) (now TFEU art 263(4)).

Opinion of Advocate General Jacobs
AG Jacobs' Opinion said the court's existing case law was incompatible with effective judicial protection. Non-privileged applicants should be regarded as individually concerned when a measure was liable to have substantial adverse effects on his or her interests. He argued the law should be liberalised because (1) the preliminary ruling procedure gave no right for individuals to make a reference, and therefore had no right of access to the CJ (2) only allowing standing when there is no national law way to trigger a preliminary ruling is not enough (3) there could be, as here, an absence of remedy as of right when national law fails to contain any (4) so the solution is to recognise standing where a measure has 'a substantial adverse effect on his interests' (5) objections to enlarge standing are flawed – there is nothing against it in the treaties (6) the settled case law is ripe for change, especially since member states have liberalised JR themselves.

Court of Justice
The Court of Justice, rejecting Jacobs' opinion, upheld Plaumann & Co v Commission, but accepted the individuals should have redress. This could be achieved through national courts. If that was not possible, it would be the member state's fault. UPA should have standing for a direct action whenever a remedy did not exist in national law, because the CJ would have to rule on national law rules when it had no such jurisdiction.

See also

European Union law

References

Court of Justice of the European Union case law